Rontrez DeMon Johnson (born December 8, 1976) is a former Major League Baseball outfielder who played for one season. He played in eight games for the Kansas City Royals during the 2003 Kansas City Royals season.

Johnson was selected out of Marshall High School by the Boston Red Sox in the sixteenth round of the 1995 Major League Baseball draft. Johnson signed as a free agent with the Kansas City Royals before the 2002 season. During the 2002–03, he changed employers three times. He signed with the Texas Rangers in October 2002, was selected by the Oakland Athletics in the Rule 5 draft in December 2002 and selected off waivers by the Royals in April 2003.

He made his Major League debut in the second game of the 2003 season at Kauffman Stadium as a defensive replacement for pinch hitter Desi Relaford. He appeared in seven more games that season, largely as a pinch runner. He recorded his only Major League hit on April 14 against Chad Paronto of the Cleveland Indians at Jacobs Field.

On April 18, 2003, he was returned by the Royals to the Rangers. On July 14, the Rangers released him. He signed with the Atlanta Braves on July 18, 2003 and played the remainder of the year in their farm system before being released on October 15.

Johnson spent the following two seasons playing in the Mexican League and the Mexican Pacific League. The 2008 season was his final in professional baseball. He played for the Schaumburg Flyers of the independent Northern League.

, Johnson was living in Texas and owned a trucking company.

References

External links

1976 births
Living people
African-American baseball players
American expatriate baseball players in Mexico
Baseball players from Texas
Cañeros de Los Mochis players
Gulf Coast Red Sox players
Kansas City Royals players
Lowell Spinners players
Major League Baseball outfielders
Michigan Battle Cats players
Oklahoma RedHawks players
Omaha Royals players
Pawtucket Red Sox players
Richmond Braves players
Rieleros de Aguascalientes players
Sarasota Red Sox players
Schaumburg Flyers players
Trenton Thunder players
21st-century African-American sportspeople
20th-century African-American sportspeople